The De Mot was an American automobile manufactured only in 1910.  A product of Detroit, it was a two-seater with a two-cylinder engine.  Its name was derived from its origins, and stood for "DEtroit MOTor"

References

Defunct motor vehicle manufacturers of the United States
Motor vehicle manufacturers based in Michigan
Defunct manufacturing companies based in Detroit